Vitaly Kryuchin is a Russian sport shooter and president of the International Practical Shooting Confederation and Russian Federation of Practical Shooting. He has one gold and bronze medal from the IPSC European Shotgun Championship (2003 and 2006) and one gold medal from the IPSC European Handgun Championship (2007).

Beside competition shooting, Kryuchin is known for his point shooting skills. A video went viral in September 2016 where he teamed up with an orchestra of two singers, a violinist and a keyboardist, and played the Ode To Joy by Beethoven, Old MacDonald Had a Farm and a traditional Russian tune by shooting at pitched steel plates.

References

External links 
 Glockophone music - YouTube - practical shooting channel

Russian male sport shooters
IPSC shooters
Living people
1963 births